"Spring is Here" is a 1938 popular song composed by Richard Rodgers, with lyrics by Lorenz Hart for the musical I Married an Angel (1938), where it was introduced by Dennis King and Vivienne Segal.

Rodgers and Hart had previously written a song entitled "Spring is Here in Person," which served as the title song for a 1929 Broadway production (filmed in 1930 - see Spring is Here (film)). 

Theatrical producer Josh Logan, a longtime associate of Rodgers & Hart, would opine that "the most touching [of Hart's lyrics] are those about unrequited love [with the 1938 song] 'Spring is Here' [being] one of the greatest examples". Hart had had a romantic interest in I Married an Angel leading lady Vivienne Segal who turned down more than one marriage proposal from him. Logan believed that Hart's lyrics for "Spring is Here" evoked the composer's disappointment over Segal's failure to reciprocate his interest.

Notable recordings
 Chet Baker – Deep in a Dream (2002, posthumous, previously unreleased)
 Shirley Bassey – Let's Face the Music with Nelson Riddle and his Orchestra (1962)
 Tony Bennett – The Rodgers and Hart Songbook (1973)
 Nick Brignola – L.A. Bound (1979)
 June Christy – The Intimate Miss Christy (1963)
 Rosemary Clooney- Rosemary Clooney Sings Ballads (1985) 
 John Coltrane – Standard Coltrane (1958)
 Chris Connor – Sings Lullabys of Birdland (1957)
Larry Coryell – Private Concert (1999) 
 Vic Damone – That Towering Feeling! (1956)
 Miles Davis – Miles Davis at Carnegie Hall (1961)
 Bill Evans – Portrait in Jazz (1959)
 Ella Fitzgerald – Ella Fitzgerald Sings the Rodgers & Hart Songbook (1956), 30 by Ella (1968)
 The Four Freshmen – Love Lost (1959)
 Erroll Garner – (1950)
 Ahmad Jamal – Chamber Music of the New Jazz (1955)
 Felix Knight – Original 78rpm: Victor 25842 – Spring Is Here (Rodgers-Hart) by Leo Reisman & His Orchestra (1938)
 Julie London – Julie Is Her Name, Volume II (1958)
 Susannah McCorkle – I'll Take Romance (1992)
 Jessye Norman – The J.Norman Collection (1984)
 Anita O'Day – Anita O'Day and Billy May Swing Rodgers and Hart (1960)
 Carly Simon – Torch (1981)
 Nina Simone – Nina Simone with Strings (1966)
 Frank Sinatra – Columbia single (1947); Sinatra Sings for Only the Lonely (1958)
 Jo Stafford – As You Desire Me (1952)
 Maxine Sullivan with Claude Thornhill & His Orchestra (1938)
 The Supremes – The Supremes Sing Rodgers & Hart (1967)
 Cal Tjader – Soul Sauce (1964)
 Danny Zeitlin – Mosaic Select (1967)

References

External links
Spring is Here at jazzstandards.com

Songs with music by Richard Rodgers
Songs with lyrics by Lorenz Hart
Ella Fitzgerald songs
Nina Simone songs
Jo Stafford songs
1938 songs
1930s jazz standards